Hakea nodosa, commonly known as yellow hakea, is a shrub that is endemic to Australia. It usually has golden yellow flowers in profusion and needle-shaped leaves.

Description
The branchlets quickly form ribbing or slowly becoming smooth. The inflorescence consists of 2-11 cream-white to golden yellow flowers in profusion,  clustered along the branches. The inflorescence is on a simple stem densely covered with upright hairs, they may be white, brown or a combination of both. These are followed by woody seed capsules that are 30 to 35 mm long. Two contrasting types of the latter are produced, one that is woody with contrasting lighter bumps, and the other that is smooth, not woody and opens while still attached to the branch. Flowering occurs from May to August.

Taxonomy and naming
Hakea nodosa was first formally described by botanist Robert Brown in 1810 and the description was published in  Transactions of the Linnean Society of London. The specific epithet is derived from the Latin word nodosus meaning "knotty", referring to the prominent knobs on the fruit.

Distribution and habitat
Yellow hakea occurs in south-eastern South Australia, Victoria and north-eastern Tasmania in dense heath woodlands, usually in winter wet locations on clay soil.

Cultivation
Yellow hakea is adaptable to a wide range of soils and climatic conditions and will grow well in full sun or part shade.

References

nodosa
Flora of South Australia
Flora of Tasmania
Flora of Victoria (Australia)
Endemic flora of Australia
Taxa named by Robert Brown (botanist, born 1773)
Plants described in 1810